Ziad Takieddine (born 14 June 1950) is a Lebanese-French businessman, described by The Telegraph as an "arms broker".

Early life
Ziad Takieddine was born on 14 June 1950 in Baakline, Lebanon into a Druze family. His uncle Saiid Takieddine was Lebanese Ambassador in London, and his father was Ambassador in various countries. He was educated at the American University in Beirut and the University of Reading in England.

Career
In the 1990s, he was the manager of the Isola 2000 ski resort in Isola, Alpes-Maritimes, France.

He later facilitated arms dealing between France and Middle East countries, including Saudi Arabia,  Pakistan, Syria and Libya. He was condemned to a five-year prison sentence by the French Court of Justice of the Republic in June 2020 for using some of those funds to finance the unsuccessful presidential campaign of former French Prime Minister Edouard Balladur in the context of the Karachi affair.

He facilitated the release of Bulgarian nurses from Libya and organized Libya President Muammar Gaddafi's 2007 visit to France. He has since accused former French President Nicolas Sarkozy of taking 5 million euros from Libyan President Muammar Gaddafi from 2006 to 2007 to finance his presidential campaign, a claim echoed by Saif al-Islam Gaddafi.

On 4 December 2020, he was detained in Lebanon due to allegations of covert financing to Sarkozy's presidential campaign. On 8 December, Lebanon ordered his release, but also imposed a travel ban on him.

Personal life
His ex-wife, Nicola Johnson, is British-born. She has accused him of tax evasion in France. Takieddine owned Warwick House in London's Holland Park district via a company in the tax haven of the British Virgin Islands. It was sold to neighbour Brian May for £12 million following the divorce settlement. In 2013 Takieddine was denied entry to the United Kingdom following an "allegation of fraud" and was forced by British police to return to France.

Takieddine is an uncle of Amal Alamuddin, who is married to the actor George Clooney.

References

1950 births
French people of Lebanese descent
Lebanese Druze
French businesspeople
Lebanese businesspeople
Living people
People named in the Panama Papers
People from Chouf District